1st ZAI Awards

Presenter  Union of Authors and Performers 

Broadcaster STV 

Grand Prix Dežo Ursiny

2nd ►

The 1st ZAI Awards, honoring the best in the Slovak music industry for individual achievements for the year of 1990, took place at the Hotel Kiev in Bratislava in 1991.

Winners

Main categories

Others

References

External links
 ZAI Awards > Winners (Official site)
 ZAI Awards > 1990 Winners (at SME)

01
Zai Awards
1990 music awards